Nils Holger Östensson (29 April 1918, Transtrand, Dalarna – 24 July 1949 at the same place) was a Swedish cross-country skier who competed in the 1940s. He won the 4 × 10 km relay gold and the 18 km silver at the 1948 Winter Olympics in St. Moritz.

Östensson also won the 18 km and 50 km events at the Holmenkollen ski festival in 1949.

He died in a motorcycle accident on 24 July 1949.

Cross-country skiing results
All results are sourced from the International Ski Federation (FIS).

Olympic Games
 2 medals – (1 gold, 1 silver)

References

External links
 
 Holmenkollen winners since 1892 - click Vinnere for downloadable pdf file 
 

1918 births
1949 deaths
People from Malung-Sälen Municipality
Cross-country skiers from Dalarna County
Cross-country skiers at the 1948 Winter Olympics
Holmenkollen Ski Festival winners
Olympic cross-country skiers of Sweden
Olympic gold medalists for Sweden
Olympic silver medalists for Sweden
Swedish male cross-country skiers
Motorcycle road incident deaths
Olympic medalists in cross-country skiing
Medalists at the 1948 Winter Olympics
Road incident deaths in Sweden